Theodosia Christidou (born September 12, 1980) known professionally as Sissy Christidou, is a Greek television host and YouTuber. Born and raised Thessaloniki, studied in Music High School and at the age of 21 she started working as TV host in a small Macedonian channel named "TV 100". She has also hosted "Agrotis monos psaxnei", a weekly show on Alpha TV. She was co-hosting the morning show "Mes Tin Kali Hara" on Alpha TV but she moved to ANT1 to co-host the daily morning show Proino ANT1 with Giorgos Papadakis and Christos Ferentinos. From 2018 she is hosting the weekend show "Ela Xamogela (Έλα Χαμόγελα)" on Open TV.

Life and career
Christidou was born in Thessaloniki to Mina and Thodoris Christidis. She has a brother named Giannis. She studied in Music High School and at the age of 21 started working as TV host in a small Macedonian channel named "TV 100".
She hosted "Agrotis monos psaxnei", a weekly show on Alpha TV. She was co-hosting the morning show "Mes Tin Kali Hara" on Alpha TV but she moved to ANT1 to co-host the daily morning show Proino ANT1 with Giorgos Papadakis and Christos Ferentinos. Since 2014, she designs and sells clothes on her website, www.sissychristidou.com.

Filmography

Film

Television

Personal life
In 2005, Christidou began dating the singer of Onirama, Thodoris Marantinis. On August 13, 2008, she gave birth to their first son, Philipos-Rafael and one year later, on August 16, 2009, they got married. On August 29, 2013, she gave birth to their second son, Michael-Aggelos. On April 23, 2019, Christidou and Marantinis announced that they were separating.

References

Greek television presenters
Greek women television presenters
Living people
1980 births
Mass media people from Thessaloniki